Peter or Pete Shelton is the name of:
Peter L. Shelton (1946–2012), American architect
Peter Shelton (sculptor) (born 1951), American sculptor
Pete Shelton (musician) in The Outsiders (American band)
Pete Shelton, fictional character in It Conquered the World
Peter Shelton, editor of A One Man Show
Peter Shelton, violinist on S&M (album)
Peter Shelton, marine biologist and namesake of Uromunna sheltoni

See also
Peter Shilton (born 1949), English former footballer
Peter Skelton, cricketer